Luciobarbus barbulus is a species of ray-finned fish in the genus Luciobarbus from Iran.

References 
 

Luciobarbus
Fish described in 1847